Bullamakanka was an Australian country music trio formed in 1978. The band toured extensively throughout the 1980s and their distinctive melding of Australian bush music with American bluegrass gained them a large following. 

In 1986, Rex Radonich died in a car accident and Rod McCormack joined the band.
The band's single, "Home Amongst the Gum Trees", brought them a considerable measure of crossover success.

Ray Young died of liver cancer in March 2004.

Discography

Albums

Studio albums

Live albums

Compilation albums

Singles

Awards

Country Music Awards of Australia

The Country Music Awards of Australia (CMAA) (also known as the Golden Guitar Awards) is an annual awards night held in January during the Tamworth Country Music Festival, celebrating recording excellence in the Australian country music industry. They have been held annually since 1973.

|-
| 1982
| "Home Among the Gum Trees"
| Vocal Group or Duo of the Year
| 
|-
| 1984
| "Gaylene"
| Vocal Group or Duo of the Year
| 
|-
| 1985
| "G'Day"
| Vocal Group or Duo of the Year
| 
|-
| 1989
| "Bullabounce"
| Instrumental of the Year
| 
|-
| 1990
| "Ride These Roads"
| Vocal Group or Duo of the Year
| 
|-
| 1991
| "Dust"
| Vocal Group or Duo of the Year
| 

 Note: wins only

References

Australian country music groups
Musical groups established in 1978